Əlibəyli (also, Alibeyli) is a village and municipality in the Tovuz Rayon of Azerbaijan.  It has a population of 2,497.

Notable natives 

 Gasim Rzayev — National Hero of Azerbaijan.

References 

Populated places in Tovuz District